Dracotettix monstrosus, the gray dragon lubber, is a species of lubber grasshopper in the family Romaleidae. It is found in North America.

References

Romaleidae
Articles created by Qbugbot
Insects described in 1889